Aniulus garius is a species of millipede in the family Parajulidae. It is found in North America.

References

Further reading

 

Julida
Articles created by Qbugbot
Animals described in 1912